Coturnicops is a genus of bird in the rail family.

The genus was erected by the English zoologist George Robert Gray in 1855 with the yellow rail (Coturnicops noveboracensis) as the type species. The genus name combines coturnix, the Latin word for a "quail", with ōps, an Ancient Greek word meaning "appearance".

Species
The genus contains the following three species:

References

 
Rallidae
Birds described in 1855
Taxa named by George Robert Gray
Taxonomy articles created by Polbot
Bird genera